César Mercado (born October 25, 1959 in Maricao, Puerto Rico) is a retired Puerto Rican marathon runner. He competed for his native country in the men's marathon at the 1984 Summer Olympics, finishing in 31st place. He set his personal best in the classic distance (2:17.31) in 1982.

Achievements

References
 sports-reference

1959 births
Living people
Puerto Rican male marathon runners
Puerto Rican male long-distance runners
Olympic track and field athletes of Puerto Rico
Athletes (track and field) at the 1983 Pan American Games
Athletes (track and field) at the 1984 Summer Olympics
Athletes (track and field) at the 1991 Pan American Games
Athletes (track and field) at the 1995 Pan American Games
People from Maricao, Puerto Rico
Pan American Games medalists in athletics (track and field)
Pan American Games silver medalists for Puerto Rico
Central American and Caribbean Games silver medalists for Puerto Rico
Competitors at the 1990 Central American and Caribbean Games
Central American and Caribbean Games medalists in athletics
Medalists at the 1983 Pan American Games
20th-century Puerto Rican people